Harpalus inexspectatus is a species of ground beetle in the subfamily Harpalinae. It was described by Kataev in 1989.

References

inexspectatus
Beetles described in 1989